Paul Renno Heyl (1872 in Philadelphia – 22 October 1961) was an American inventor, physicist, and author.

Biography

Born in Philadelphia, Heyl earned his PhD in physics in 1899 from the University of Pennsylvania. For several years he taught in high schools in Pennsylvania. In 1907, he won the Franklin Institute's Boyden Premium. In 1910, he joined the physics staff of the Commercial Research Corporation in New York. In 1920, he was employed as a physicist at the National Bureau of Standards in Washington D.C. With Lyman J. Briggs, Heyl invented the Heyl–Briggs earth inductor compass. The compass used a spinning electric coil mounted in an airplane to determine the airplane's bearing in relation to the Earth's magnetic field. This invention won for Heyl and Briggs the 1922 Magellan Medal of the American Philosophical Society. At the NBS, Heyl worked on a redetermination of Newton's constant of gravitation using a torsion balance. In 1928, Heyl served as president of the Philosophical Society of Washington. He retired form the NBS in 1942. He won the Potts medal in 1943.

He married Lucy Knight Daugherty; they had two daughters, one of whom died in infancy.

Selected publications

with V. L. Chrisler:

References

External links

The Earth Inductor Compass
"Does the speed of light in space depend upon its wave-length?" by Paul R. Heyl

1872 births
1961 deaths
20th-century American inventors
American physicists
Fellows of the American Physical Society
Scientists from Philadelphia
University of Pennsylvania alumni
Howard N. Potts Medal recipients